Sonja Wigert (11 November 1913 – 12 April 1980) was a Norwegian-Swedish actress. She appeared in 34 films between 1934 and 1960. She was a spy in World War II. Ingrid Bolsø Berdal portrayed her in the film The Spy.

Selected filmography

 Song of Rondane (1934)
 Fant (1937)
 Life Begins Today (1939)
 Her Little Majesty (1939)
 Frestelse (1940)
 Her Melody (1940)
Lucky Young Lady (1941)
 The Case of Ingegerd Bremssen (1942)
 Ombyte av tåg (1943)
 Count Only the Happy Moments (1944)
 My People Are Not Yours (1944)
 Blood and Fire (1945)
 Onsdagsväninnan (1946)
 Letter from the Dead (1946)
 One Swallow Does Not Make a Summer (En fluga gör ingen sommar) (1947)
 Vi flyr på Rio (1949)
 Alt dette og Island med (1951)
 Kvinnan bakom allt (1951)
 Hidden in the Fog (1953)
 The Dance Hall (1955)

References

External links
 

1913 births
1980 deaths
Norwegian film actresses
Norwegian spies
20th-century Norwegian actresses
World War II spies for Sweden